Boats Against the Current is a 1977 album by Eric Carmen. The title is taken from a line in the novel The Great Gatsby by F. Scott Fitzgerald, “So we beat on, boats against the current, borne back ceaselessly into the past.”  It was Carmen's second solo LP, after the Raspberries disbanded.  It peaked at #45 on the Billboard album chart for the week ending October 8, 1977.

The album yielded two charting singles, the title track as well as "She Did It."  "She Did It" is the bigger hit from this album, which reached #23 Billboard and #15 Cash Box, as well as #11 in Canada.  The title track subsequently reached #88 Billboard and #92 Cash Box. "Marathon Man" was released as a third single in March 1978 but failed to chart.  "Love Is All That Matters" melody is lifted from Tschaikovsky's "Fifth Symphony, Second Movement."

Guest musicians on this album included back-up vocals by several of the Beach Boys and Burton Cummings (formerly of the Guess Who), guitar by Andrew Gold, and drumming by Nigel Olsson and Toto's Jeff Porcaro.

The title song was covered by Frankie Valli on his 1977 LP Lady Put the Light Out. "Boats Against the Current" was also covered in 1978 by Olivia Newton-John on her album Totally Hot, and it was included as the B-side of her single release, "Rest Your Love on Me." Patti LaBelle also included the song on her 1981 LP, The Spirit's in It.

As reported by Casey Kasem on the American Top 40 program of October 15, 1977, Boats Against the Current cost $375,000 to produce, six times the average cost for an album of that era. The LP had a series of false starts. Across six months starting in February 1977, three sessions with Elton John's producer Gus Dudgeon were undertaken using recording studios in London, Cleveland, and Los Angeles, but were all scrapped. Carmen then took over the production efforts himself before the tracks were complete and he was satisfied.

Live performances 

Carmen performed three tracks from the LP ("She Did It," "Boats Against the Current" and "Marathon Man") on The Midnight Special television program (season 6, episode 5) on October 14, 1977.  The show was hosted by Marilyn McCoo & Billy Davis Jr.

Track listing 
All tracks composed by Eric Carmen:
 "Boats Against the Current" – 4:22
 "Marathon Man" – 3:55
 "Nowhere To Hide" – 5:05
 "Take It or Leave It" – 4:00
 "Love Is All That Matters" – 4:17
 "She Did It" – 3:48
 "I Think I Found Myself" – 4:25
 "Run Away" – 8:05

Personnel 
 Eric Carmen – lead vocals, acoustic piano, synthesizers (1, 2, 5-7), electric guitar (1, 4), string arrangements and conductor (1, 5), electric harpsichord (2, 3), drums (2), 12-string acoustic guitar (4), percussion (4-7), backing vocals (5-7), BGV arrangements (6)
 Michael Boddicker – synthesizers (2, 3, 5, 7, 8)
 Richard Reising – acoustic guitar (2, 5), acoustic piano (4), electric guitar (4, 6, 8), guitar solo (4), backing vocals (4-7)
 Richie Zito – acoustic guitar (2, 4, 5), electric guitar (4, 6, 8), backing vocals (4)
 Andrew Gold – electric guitar solo (6), electric guitar (8)
 Dave Wintour – bass
 Jeff Porcaro – drums (1, 5, 6)
 Nigel Olsson – drums (2-4, 7, 8), backing vocals (5-7)
 Gene Estes – percussion (1-3, 8)
 Ollie E. Brown – percussion (6, 8)
 Jim Horn – saxophone (4)
 Bobby Keys – saxophone (4)
 Tom Scott – saxophone (4, 7)
 Steve Madaio – trumpet (4)
 Paul Buckmaster – string arrangements and conductor (2, 3, 6, 8)
 Burton Cummings – backing vocals (2)
 Curt Becher – backing vocals (5-7)
 Joe Chemay – backing vocals (5-7)
 Bruce Johnston – backing vocals (5-7), BGV arrangements (5-7)
 Brian Wilson – backing vocals (5-7)

Production 
 Eric Carmen – producer, arrangements 
 Kevin Beamish – engineer 
 Larry Emerine – engineer 
 David Henson – engineer 
 Mark Howlett – engineer 
 Dennis Kirk – engineer 
 Tim Kramer – engineer 
 Earle Mankey – engineer 
 Howard Steele – engineer 
 Thom Wilson – engineer 
 Val Garay – mixing
 Doug Sax – mastering 
 Bob Heimall – art direction 
 Ed Caraeff – design, photography 
 Benno Friedman – inside photography effects 
 Norman Adams – inside artwork 
 Michael Manoogian – calligraphy

Studios
 Recorded at Crystal Sound and Studio 55 (Los Angeles, California); The Sound Factory (Hollywood, California); Brother Studios (Santa Monica, California).
 Mixed at The Sound Factory
 Mastered at The Mastering Lab (Hollywood, California).

Charts

References 

Eric Carmen albums
1977 albums
Albums arranged by Paul Buckmaster
Arista Records albums